, better known as Harold Sakata, was an American Olympic weightlifter, professional wrestler, and film actor of Japanese descent. He won a silver medal for the United States at the 1948 Summer Olympics in London in weightlifting, and later became a popular professional wrestler under the ring name Tosh Togo, wrestling primarily for various National Wrestling Alliance territories as a tag team with Great Togo. He also wrestled extensively in Japan for All Japan Pro Wrestling, and was a one-time All Asia Tag Team Championship with Rikidōzan. On the basis of his wrestling work, he was cast in the James Bond film Goldfinger (1964) as the villain Oddjob, a role he would be closely associated with for the rest of his life.

Early life 
Toshiyuki Sakata was born on July 1, 1920, in Holualoa, Hawaii, to Japanese-American parents who worked at a Kona coffee farm. His father Risaburo was issei (first-generation), and his mother Matsue was nisei. He had ten siblings, six brothers and four sisters. He adopted the more Western name "Harold" as a teenager.

In 1936, Sakata dropped out of school to help work the family's coffee farm. The following year, he started paid employment at a sugar plantation located about 75 miles away from his home, after which he went to the island of Lanai to work on a pineapple plantation. He then moved to Maui to do more agricultural work, and in 1938 he ended up in Honolulu, where he would live for much of his adult life.

During World War II, he served in the U.S. Army with the 1399th Engineer Construction Battalion, and was briefly deployed to Hawaii.

Weightlifting career 
At the age of eighteen, Sakata weighed only 113 lb (8 st 1 lb) (51 kg) at a height of 5 ft 8 in (1.73 m). Wishing to "look as good as the other guys", he started lifting weights. Because all YMCA facilities were racially segregated at the time, he trained primarily at the all-Asian Nu'uanu YMCA. Among his lifting partners was future Amateur Athletic Union (AAU) champion Emerick Ishikawa.

After about a year of serious training Sakata had gained about twenty pounds. Inspired by this success he started entering local lifting contests and in 1941 he won the Territorial light-heavyweight championship. The Japanese attack on Pearl Harbor stopped travel to the mainland but over the next two years Sakata won several more Oahu championships; in June 1943, at 165 pounds, he was pressing 250, snatching 240, and clean and jerking 310, for a total of 800 pounds.

Following his military discharge, Sakata remained in Honolulu, and became de facto leader of a group of local lifters including Richard Tomita.

During a tournament held at the Nuuanu YMCA on in November 1946, Sakata set a Hawaiian record in both the snatch and the clean-and-jerk, plus an unofficial world record in the press. The same year he also won the Mr. Hawaii physique title. Henry Koizumi, athletic director of the tournament, suggested that Sakata and his partner Richard Tom organize a weightlifting team. The goal was to place well in the USA Weightlifting National Championships, which were held in Dallas, Texas, on in June 1947. Sakata placed first in the 181-pound class with a total lift of 800 pounds. Tom meanwhile placed first in the 123-pound division with a total lift of 610 pounds.

Sakata subsequently qualified for United States' 1948 London Summer Olympic team, lifting a total of 380 kg in the light-heavyweight division and winning a silver medal behind Stanley Stanczyk, whom he later competed against in the US Senior National Championships.

Professional wrestling career

Early years 
In 1949, Sakata retired from weightlifting and began training in professional wrestling. His instructors were Tetsuro Higami and Ben Sherman. He initially wrestled as "the Human Tank, Mr. Sakata", drawing on his World War II service and Olympic accolades to play a face, though he later adopted his more well-known heel gimmick of Tosh Togo.

Under the Togo gimmick, Sakata wrestled across Hawaii and later toured mainland America and Canada, mostly on the West Coast and in the Pacific Northwest, which had a large Japanese immigrant population he proved popular with. He briefly formed a tag-team with Frank Stojack during a tour of Washington state, and also tagged with Tor Yamato during a Midwestern tour.

Japan 
In July 1951, NWA Hawaii promoter Al Karasick invited Sakata to join a special overseas tour to Japan, sponsored by a Tokyo Shriners chapter as a charity venture for a children's hospital. Sakata and several other wrestlers flew to Tokyo, where they held a series of shows at the Metropolitan Memorial Hall and Ryōgoku Kokugikan. One such show was historically significant for being the professional wrestling debut of Rikidōzan, a Korean-born sumotori who would become one of the most popular and influential figures in Japanese professional wrestling history, nicknamed "the Father of Puroresu".

According to the official website of the city of Minato, Rikidōzan was introduced to professional wrestling while visiting a gym in Shiba where Sakata and his colleague Bobby Bruns were training for an upcoming match. Bruns would become Rikidōzan's first ever opponent. He joined Sakata and Bruns in their tour of Japan, wrestling a series of matches across the country in which Rikidōzan soundly beat his foreign opponents, among them retired heavyweight boxer Joe Louis, helping to establish his popular reputation.

The tour lasted until January 1952, at which point most of the wrestlers returned to America. Sakata remained for another few months, during which time he met and married his wife. He would be granted permanent residency in Japan and live there with his family for some time, but eventually moved back to America due to the constant back-and-forth travel.

Tag-team success 
Sakata returned to America in 1952, and had his first televised match on May 26 on a card that included former judoka Masahiko Kimura and Kinji Shibuya. It was during this period that Sakata adopted the ring name Tosh Togo - Tosh was a shortened form of his given name "Toshiyuki" and Togo was derived from early 20th-century Japanese admiral Tōgō Heihachirō.

Sakata was billed as the kayfabe brother of Great Togo, as well as Masutatsu Oyama as "Mas Togo" and judoka Kokichi Endo as "Ko Togo". As a tag team, Sakata and Great Togo held the NWA Canadian Open Tag Team Championship. Sakata also tagged at various times with Rikidōzan (with whom he won the All Asia Tag Team Championship) and King Curtis Iaukea (with whom he won the NWA Hawaii Tag Team Championship). He was also at various times the NWA Texas Heavyweight Championship, the WWC Puerto Rico Heavyweight Championship, and the NWA World Tag Team Championship (with Red Berry).

Acting career
Bond producers Harry Saltzman and Albert R. Broccoli took notice of Sakata because of his heavy build—he stood 5 ft 10 in (1.78 m) and weighed 284 lb (129 kg)—which, when coupled with his intimidating gaze, made him the perfect choice for the part of Oddjob. Another story, told by director Guy Hamilton, stated that he'd first seen Sakata wrestling in Australia.

Sakata had never acted before, besides pro wrestling, but the film character was to be mute (other than a few uttered grunts) and would require little theatrical skill. Before Sakata had secured the role of Oddjob, another former wrestler, British actor Milton Reid, had auditioned for the role. Reid allegedly challenged Sakata to a shoot wrestling contest and suggested that the winner ought to get the role. However, given that Reid had been in Dr. No (playing one of the titular villain's guards) and that his character had been killed off, the producers decided to go with Sakata and the wrestling match did not take place.

As Oddjob, he was a bodyguard to Bond villain Auric Goldfinger, and his sharpened, steel-brimmed bowler hat became a famous and much-parodied trademark of the Bond series. While filming Oddjob's death scene, in which the character is electrocuted, Sakata's hand was badly burnt by the effect, but he held on until he heard director Guy Hamilton call "Cut".

Sakata appeared in several other movies in similar roles and took on "Oddjob" as an informal middle name (in the films Mako: The Jaws of Death (1976) and The Happy Hooker Goes to Washington (1977) he was credited as Harold "Oddjob" Sakata).

With time, Sakata's acting skills developed. He co-starred opposite William Shatner in the movie Impulse (1974), in which he played the character Karate Pete. He also guest starred on a Gilligan's Island episode as Rory Calhoun's henchman, and an episode of The Rockford Files. In 1971, Sakata was a regular on the short-lived TV series, Sarge, starring George Kennedy, and Highcliffe Manor in 1979.

He appeared as Oddjob in a series of TV commercials for Vicks Formula 44 cough syrup in the 1970s. The advertisement commonly showed Oddjob with a nasty cough, which results in him demolishing everything around him as his spasms make him inadvertently lash out, frightening his wife as his condition deteriorates. She grabs a bottle of Vicks Formula 44 and gives Oddjob a spoonful of the cough syrup, which cures his cough; the two bow to each other, and then the wife looks past Oddjob to take in the destruction he has caused. This was occasionally followed by an add-on for a cough drop version of the syrup, which Oddjob ingests before he is claimed by a coughing fit in an extremely crowded space. At least one domestic and one outdoor version of this commercial are known. Sakata made an appearance on The Tonight Show Starring Johnny Carson on which he parodied the commercial by destroying Carson's set.

Personal life
Sakata had two children, born in 1954 and 1957. He only married once, and divorced his wife due to the strain placed on their relationship by his constant travel.

Death
Sakata died of liver cancer four weeks after his 62nd birthday, on July 29, 1982, in St Francis Hospital, Honolulu, Hawaii. Five months prior, Sakata made one final public appearance at the 54th Academy Awards. Sakata briefly appeared on stage in his Oddjob attire during Sheena Easton's musical performance of "For Your Eyes Only".

Championships and accomplishments
50th State Big Time Wrestling
NWA Hawaii Heavyweight Championship (1 time)
NWA Hawaii Tag Team Championship (1 time) – with King Curtis Iaukea
Maple Leaf Wrestling
NWA Canadian Open Tag Team Championship (1 time) – with Great Togo
Mid-Atlantic Championship Wrestling
NWA Southern Tag Team Championship (Mid-Atlantic version) (1 time) – with Ike Eakins
NWA Big Time Wrestling
NWA Texas Heavyweight Championship (1 time)
NWA Hollywood Wrestling
NWA International Television Tag Team Championship (2 times) – with Wild Red Berry (1) and Great Togo (1)
NWA World Tag Team Championship (Los Angeles version) (1 time) – with "Wild" Red Berry
NWA Mid-America
NWA Southern Tag Team Championship (Mid-America version) (1 time) – with John Smith
Pacific Northwest Wrestling
NWA Pacific Northwest Tag Team Championship (2 times) – with Toi Yamamoto
World Wrestling Council
WWC Puerto Rico Heavyweight Championship (1 time)

Filmography

Feature films
 Goldfinger (1964) .... Oddjob
 Balearic Caper (1966) .... Museum Director
 The Poppy Is Also a Flower (1966) .... Martin
 Le dix-septième ciel (1966) .... (uncredited)
 Dimension 5 (1966) .... Big Buddha
 The Phynx (1970) .... Sakata 
 Impulse (1974) .... Karate Pete 
 The Wrestler (1974) .... Oddjob 
 Broken House (1976) .... (uncredited) 
 Mako: The Jaws Of Death (1976) .... Pete
 Bao po (1976)
 The Happy Hooker Goes to Washington (1977) .... Wong
 Record City (1978) .... Gucci 
 Death Dimension (1978) .... The Pig
 Goin' Coconuts (1978) .... Ito
 The Billion Dollar Threat (1979, TV Movie) .... Oriental Man 
 Bruce contre-attaque (also known as Xiong zhong and Ninja Strikes Back) (1982) .... Sakata
 Safari of No Return aka Horror Safari (Invaders of the Lost Gold) (1982) .... Tobachi (final film role)

Television
 Kraft Suspense Theatre (1965) Episode: Jungle of Fear .... Ching
Additionally, Japanese professional wrestler Keiji Mutoh plays Sakata in the 2004 film Rikidozan.

References

External links
 Profile at History of Olympic Weightlifting
 
 Championship Wrestling from Florida: Tosh Togo
 

1920 births
1982 deaths
20th-century American male actors
American male actors of Japanese descent
American male professional wrestlers
American male weightlifters
American male film actors
American film actors of Asian descent
American sportspeople of Japanese descent
American military personnel of Japanese descent
American expatriates in Japan
Deaths from cancer in Hawaii
Deaths from liver cancer
Faux Japanese professional wrestlers
Male actors from Hawaii
Medalists at the 1948 Summer Olympics
Olympic weightlifters of the United States
Olympic silver medalists for the United States in weightlifting
People from Hawaii (island)
Professional wrestlers from Hawaii
Sportspeople from Hawaii
United States Army personnel of World War II
Weightlifters at the 1948 Summer Olympics
20th-century professional wrestlers
WWC Puerto Rico Champions
NWA Canadian Open Tag Team Champions